Who Knows What Tomorrow's Gonna Bring? is an album by American organist Brother Jack McDuff recorded in 1970 and released on the Blue Note label.

Reception
The Allmusic review by Thom Jurek awarded the album 3½ stars and stated "Who Knows What Tomorrow's Gonna Bring? is one of Brother Jack's more adventurous dates, and incorporates all sorts of strange pop elements in the mix... The sheer spaced-out vibe is an overwhelming attraction to Who Knows What Tomorrow's Gonna Bring?, because it is unlike any other record in McDuff's massive catalog -- even stranger than Moon Rappin'".

Track listing
All compositions by Jack McDuff except as indicated
 "Who Knows What Tomorrow's Gonna Bring?" (Ray Draper) - 5:56
 "Ya Ya Ya Ya Ya Ya" (Draper) - 9:46
 "Who's Pimpin' Who?" (Draper) - 5:44
 "Classic Funke" - 7:24
 "Ya'll Remember Boogie?" (Draper) - 4:50
 "Wank's Thang" - 6:04
Recorded at The Hit Factory in New York City on December 1 (tracks 2 & 5), December 2 (tracks 1 & 3) and December 3 (tracks 4 & 6), 1970.

Personnel
Brother Jack McDuff - organ
Randy Brecker, Olu Dara - trumpet
Dick Griffin, John Pierson - trombone
Paul Griffin - piano
Joe Beck - guitar
Tony Levin - electric bass
Donald McDonald - drums
Mike Mainieri - percussion
Ray Draper - percussion, vocals, tuba, arranger

References

Blue Note Records albums
Jack McDuff albums
1970 albums